A white dwarf is a stellar core remnant composed mostly of electron-degenerate matter. A white dwarf is very dense: its mass is comparable to the Sun's, while its volume is comparable to the Earth's. A white dwarf's faint luminosity comes from the emission of residual thermal energy; no fusion takes place in a white dwarf. There are currently thought to be eight white dwarfs among the hundred star systems nearest the Sun. The unusual faintness of white dwarfs was first recognized in 1910. The name white dwarf was coined by Willem Luyten in 1922.

White dwarfs are thought to be the final evolutionary state of stars whose mass is not high enough to become a neutron star or black hole. This includes over 97% of the other stars in the Milky Way. After the hydrogen-fusing period of a main-sequence star of low or medium mass ends, such a star will expand to a red giant during which it fuses helium to carbon and oxygen in its core by the triple-alpha process. If a red giant has insufficient mass to generate the core temperatures required to fuse carbon (around 1 billion K), an inert mass of carbon and oxygen will build up at its center. After such a star sheds its outer layers and forms a planetary nebula, it will leave behind a core, which is the remnant white dwarf. Usually, white dwarfs are composed of carbon and oxygen (CO white dwarf). If the mass of the progenitor is between 8 and 10.5 solar masses, the core temperature will be sufficient to fuse carbon but not neon, in which case an oxygen–neon–magnesium (ONeMg or ONe) white dwarf may form. Stars of very low mass will be unable to fuse helium; hence, a helium white dwarf may form by mass loss in binary systems.

The material in a white dwarf no longer undergoes fusion reactions, so the star has no source of energy. As a result, it cannot support itself by the heat generated by fusion against gravitational collapse, but is supported only by electron degeneracy pressure, causing it to be extremely dense. The physics of degeneracy yields a maximum mass for a non-rotating white dwarf, the Chandrasekhar limit — approximately 1.44 times  — beyond which it cannot be supported by electron degeneracy pressure. A carbon–oxygen white dwarf that approaches this mass limit, typically by mass transfer from a companion star, may explode as a type Ia supernova via a process known as carbon detonation; SN 1006 is thought to be a famous example.

A white dwarf is very hot when it forms, but because it has no source of energy, it will gradually cool as it radiates its energy away. This means that its radiation, which initially has a high color temperature, will lessen and redden with time. Over a very long time, a white dwarf will cool and its material will begin to crystallize, starting with the core. The star's low temperature means it will no longer emit significant heat or light, and it will become a cold black dwarf. Because the length of time it takes for a white dwarf to reach this state is calculated to be longer than the current age of the known universe (approximately 13.8 billion years), it is thought that no black dwarfs yet exist. The oldest known white dwarfs still radiate at temperatures of a few thousand kelvins, which establishes an observational limit on the maximum possible age of the universe.

Discovery 

The first white dwarf discovered was in the triple star system of 40 Eridani, which contains the relatively bright main sequence star 40 Eridani A, orbited at a distance by the closer binary system of the white dwarf 40 Eridani B and the main sequence red dwarf 40 Eridani C. The pair 40 Eridani B/C was discovered by William Herschel on 31 January 1783. In 1910, Henry Norris Russell, Edward Charles Pickering and Williamina Fleming discovered that, despite being a dim star, 40 Eridani B was of spectral type A, or white. In 1939, Russell looked back on the discovery:
I was visiting my friend and generous benefactor, Prof. Edward C. Pickering. With characteristic kindness, he had volunteered to have the spectra observed for all the stars – including comparison stars – which had been observed in the observations for stellar parallax which Hinks and I made at Cambridge, and I discussed. This piece of apparently routine work proved very fruitful – it led to the discovery that all the stars of very faint absolute magnitude were of spectral class M. In conversation on this subject (as I recall it), I asked Pickering about certain other faint stars, not on my list, mentioning in particular 40 Eridani B. Characteristically, he sent a note to the Observatory office and before long the answer came (I think from Mrs. Fleming) that the spectrum of this star was A. I knew enough about it, even in these paleozoic days, to realize at once that there was an extreme inconsistency between what we would then have called "possible" values of the surface brightness and density. I must have shown that I was not only puzzled but crestfallen, at this exception to what looked like a very pretty rule of stellar characteristics; but Pickering smiled upon me, and said: "It is just these exceptions that lead to an advance in our knowledge", and so the white dwarfs entered the realm of study!

The spectral type of 40 Eridani B was officially described in 1914 by Walter Adams.

The white dwarf companion of Sirius, Sirius B, was next to be discovered. During the nineteenth century, positional measurements of some stars became precise enough to measure small changes in their location. Friedrich Bessel used position measurements to determine that the stars Sirius (α Canis Majoris) and Procyon (α Canis Minoris) were changing their positions periodically. In 1844 he predicted that both stars had unseen companions:

If we were to regard Sirius and Procyon as double stars, the change of their motions would not surprise us; we should acknowledge them as necessary, and have only to investigate their amount by observation. But light is no real property of mass. The existence of numberless visible stars can prove nothing against the existence of numberless invisible ones.

Bessel roughly estimated the period of the companion of Sirius to be about half a century; C.A.F. Peters computed an orbit for it in 1851. It was not until 31 January 1862 that Alvan Graham Clark observed a previously unseen star close to Sirius, later identified as the predicted companion. Walter Adams announced in 1915 that he had found the spectrum of Sirius B to be similar to that of Sirius.

In 1917, Adriaan van Maanen discovered van Maanen's Star, an isolated white dwarf. These three white dwarfs, the first discovered, are the so-called classical white dwarfs. Eventually, many faint white stars were found which had high proper motion, indicating that they could be suspected to be low-luminosity stars close to the Earth, and hence white dwarfs. Willem Luyten appears to have been the first to use the term white dwarf when he examined this class of stars in 1922; the term was later popularized by Arthur Stanley Eddington. Despite these suspicions, the first non-classical white dwarf was not definitely identified until the 1930s. 18 white dwarfs had been discovered by 1939. Luyten and others continued to search for white dwarfs in the 1940s. By 1950, over a hundred were known, and by 1999, over 2,000 were known. Since then the Sloan Digital Sky Survey has found over 9,000 white dwarfs, mostly new.

Composition and structure 

Although white dwarfs are known with estimated masses as low as 0.17  and as high as 1.33 , the mass distribution is strongly peaked at 0.6 , and the majority lie between 0.5 and 0.7 . The estimated radii of observed white dwarfs are typically 0.8–2% the radius of the Sun; this is comparable to the Earth's radius of approximately 0.9% solar radius. A white dwarf, then, packs mass comparable to the Sun's into a volume that is typically a million times smaller than the Sun's; the average density of matter in a white dwarf must therefore be, very roughly, 1,000,000 times greater than the average density of the Sun, or approximately 106 g/cm3, or 1 tonne per cubic centimetre. A typical white dwarf has a density of between 104 and 107 g/cm3. White dwarfs are composed of one of the densest forms of matter known, surpassed only by other compact stars such as neutron stars, quark stars (hypothetical), and black holes.

White dwarfs were found to be extremely dense soon after their discovery. If a star is in a binary system, as is the case for Sirius B or 40 Eridani B, it is possible to estimate its mass from observations of the binary orbit. Since hotter bodies radiate more energy than colder ones, a star's surface brightness can be estimated from its effective surface temperature, and that from its spectrum. If the star's distance is known, its absolute luminosity can also be estimated. From the absolute luminosity and distance, the star's surface area and its radius can be calculated. Reasoning of this sort led to the realization, puzzling to astronomers at the time, that due to their relatively high temperature and relatively low absolute luminosity, Sirius B and 40 Eridani B must be very dense. When Ernst Öpik estimated the density of a number of visual binary stars in 1916, he found that 40 Eridani B had a density of over 25,000 times the Sun's, which was so high that he called it "impossible". As A.S. Eddington put it later, in 1927:
We learn about the stars by receiving and interpreting the messages which their light brings to us. The message of the companion of Sirius when it was decoded ran: "I am composed of material 3,000 times denser than anything you have ever come across; a ton of my material would be a little nugget that you could put in a matchbox." What reply can one make to such a message? The reply which most of us made in 1914 was — "Shut up. Don't talk nonsense."

As Eddington pointed out in 1924, densities of this order implied that, according to the theory of general relativity, the light from Sirius B should be gravitationally redshifted. This was confirmed when Adams measured this redshift in 1925.

Such densities are possible because white dwarf material is not composed of atoms joined by chemical bonds, but rather consists of a plasma of unbound nuclei and electrons. There is therefore no obstacle to placing nuclei closer than normally allowed by electron orbitals limited by normal matter. Eddington wondered what would happen when this plasma cooled and the energy to keep the atoms ionized was no longer sufficient. This paradox was resolved by R. H. Fowler in 1926 by an application of the newly devised quantum mechanics. Since electrons obey the Pauli exclusion principle, no two electrons can occupy the same state, and they must obey Fermi–Dirac statistics, also introduced in 1926 to determine the statistical distribution of particles which satisfy the Pauli exclusion principle. At zero temperature, therefore, electrons can not all occupy the lowest-energy, or ground, state; some of them would have to occupy higher-energy states, forming a band of lowest-available energy states, the Fermi sea. This state of the electrons, called degenerate, meant that a white dwarf could cool to zero temperature and still possess high energy.

Compression of a white dwarf will increase the number of electrons in a given volume. Applying the Pauli exclusion principle, this will increase the kinetic energy of the electrons, thereby increasing the pressure. This electron degeneracy pressure supports a white dwarf against gravitational collapse. The pressure depends only on density and not on temperature. Degenerate matter is relatively compressible; this means that the density of a high-mass white dwarf is much greater than that of a low-mass white dwarf and that the radius of a white dwarf decreases as its mass increases.

The existence of a limiting mass that no white dwarf can exceed without collapsing to a neutron star is another consequence of being supported by electron degeneracy pressure. Such limiting masses were calculated for cases of an idealized, constant density star in 1929 by Wilhelm Anderson and in 1930 by Edmund C. Stoner. This value was corrected by considering hydrostatic equilibrium for the density profile, and the presently known value of the limit was first published in 1931 by Subrahmanyan Chandrasekhar in his paper "The Maximum Mass of Ideal White Dwarfs". As the carbon-12 and oxygen-16 which predominantly compose a carbon–oxygen white dwarf both have atomic numbers equal to half their atomic weight, one should take  equal to 2 for such a star, leading to the commonly quoted value of 1.4 . (Near the beginning of the 20th century, there was reason to believe that stars were composed chiefly of heavy elements, so, in his 1931 paper, Chandrasekhar set the average molecular weight per electron, equal to 2.5, giving a limit of 0.91 .) Together with William Alfred Fowler, Chandrasekhar received the Nobel Prize for this and other work in 1983. The limiting mass is now called the Chandrasekhar limit.

If a white dwarf were to exceed the Chandrasekhar limit, and nuclear reactions did not take place, the pressure exerted by electrons would no longer be able to balance the force of gravity, and it would collapse into a denser object called a neutron star. Carbon–oxygen white dwarfs accreting mass from a neighboring star undergo a runaway nuclear fusion reaction, which leads to a Type Ia supernova explosion in which the white dwarf may be destroyed, before it reaches the limiting mass.

New research indicates that many white dwarfs – at least in certain types of galaxies – may not approach that limit by way of accretion. It has been postulated that at least some of the white dwarfs that become supernovae attain the necessary mass by colliding with one another. It may be that in elliptical galaxies such collisions are the major source of supernovae. This hypothesis is based on the fact that the X-rays produced by those galaxies are 30 to 50 times less than what is expected to be produced by type Ia supernovas of that galaxy as matter accretes on the white dwarf from its encircling companion. It has been concluded that no more than 5 percent of the supernovae in such galaxies could be created by the process of accretion onto white dwarfs. The significance of this finding is that there could be two types of supernovae, which could mean that the Chandrasekhar limit might not always apply in determining when a white dwarf goes supernova, given that two colliding white dwarfs could have a range of masses. This in turn would confuse efforts to use exploding white dwarfs as standard candles in determining distances.

White dwarfs have low luminosity and therefore occupy a strip at the bottom of the Hertzsprung–Russell diagram, a graph of stellar luminosity versus color or temperature. They should not be confused with low-luminosity objects at the low-mass end of the main sequence, such as the hydrogen-fusing red dwarfs, whose cores are supported in part by thermal pressure, or the even lower-temperature brown dwarfs.

Mass–radius relationship 
The relationship between the mass and radius of low-mass white dwarfs can be estimated using the nonrelativistic Fermi gas equation of state, which gives

Since this analysis uses the non-relativistic formula  for the kinetic energy, it is non-relativistic. When the electron velocity in a white dwarf is close to the speed of light, the kinetic energy formula approaches  where  is the speed of light, and it can be shown that there is no stable equilibrium in the ultrarelativistic limit. In particular, this analysis yields the maximum mass of a white dwarf, which is

For a more accurate computation of the mass-radius relationship and limiting mass of a white dwarf, one must compute the equation of state which describes the relationship between density and pressure in the white dwarf material. If the density and pressure are both set equal to functions of the radius from the center of the star, the system of equations consisting of the hydrostatic equation together with the equation of state can then be solved to find the structure of the white dwarf at equilibrium. In the non-relativistic case, we will still find that the radius is inversely proportional to the cube root of the mass. Relativistic corrections will alter the result so that the radius becomes zero at a finite value of the mass. This is the limiting value of the mass – called the Chandrasekhar limit – at which the white dwarf can no longer be supported by electron degeneracy pressure. The graph on the right shows the result of such a computation. It shows how radius varies with mass for non-relativistic (blue curve) and relativistic (green curve) models of a white dwarf. Both models treat the white dwarf as a cold Fermi gas in hydrostatic equilibrium. The average molecular weight per electron, has been set equal to 2. Radius is measured in standard solar radii and mass in standard solar masses.

These computations all assume that the white dwarf is non-rotating. If the white dwarf is rotating, the equation of hydrostatic equilibrium must be modified to take into account the centrifugal pseudo-force arising from working in a rotating frame. For a uniformly rotating white dwarf, the limiting mass increases only slightly. If the star is allowed to rotate nonuniformly, and viscosity is neglected, then, as was pointed out by Fred Hoyle in 1947, there is no limit to the mass for which it is possible for a model white dwarf to be in static equilibrium. Not all of these model stars will be dynamically stable.

Rotating white dwarfs and the estimates of their diameter in terms of the angular velocity of rotation has been treated in the rigorous mathematical literature. The fine structure of the free boundary of white dwarfs has also been analysed mathematically rigorously.

Radiation and cooling 
The degenerate matter that makes up the bulk of a white dwarf has a very low opacity, because any absorption of a photon requires that an electron must transition to a higher empty state, which may not be possible as the energy of the photon may not be a match for the possible quantum states available to that electron, hence radiative heat transfer within a white dwarf is low; it does, however, have a high thermal conductivity. As a result, the interior of the white dwarf maintains an almost uniform temperature as it cools down, starting at approximately 108 K shortly after the formation of the white dwarf and reaching less than 106 K for the coolest known white dwarfs. An outer shell of non-degenerate matter sits on top of the degenerate core. The outermost layers, which have temperatures below 105 K, radiate roughly as a black body. A white dwarf remains visible for a long time, as its tenuous outer atmosphere slowly radiates the thermal content of the degenerate interior.

The visible radiation emitted by white dwarfs varies over a wide color range, from the whitish-blue color of an O, B or A-type main sequence star to the yellow-orange of a late K or early M-type star. White dwarf effective surface temperatures extend from over 150,000 K to barely under 4,000 K. In accordance with the Stefan–Boltzmann law, luminosity increases with increasing surface temperature (proportional to T⁴); this surface temperature range corresponds to a luminosity from over 100 times the Sun's to under  that of the Sun's. Hot white dwarfs, with surface temperatures in excess of 30,000 K, have been observed to be sources of soft (i.e., lower-energy) X-rays. This enables the composition and structure of their atmospheres to be studied by soft X-ray and extreme ultraviolet observations.

White dwarfs also radiate neutrinos through the Urca process. This process has more effect on hotter and younger white dwarfs.

As was explained by Leon Mestel in 1952, unless the white dwarf accretes matter from a companion star or other source, its radiation comes from its stored heat, which is not replenished. White dwarfs have an extremely small surface area to radiate this heat from, so they cool gradually, remaining hot for a long time. As a white dwarf cools, its surface temperature decreases, the radiation which it emits reddens, and its luminosity decreases. Since the white dwarf has no energy sink other than radiation, it follows that its cooling slows with time. The rate of cooling has been estimated for a carbon white dwarf of 0.59  with a hydrogen atmosphere. After initially taking approximately 1.5 billion years to cool to a surface temperature of 7,140 K, cooling approximately 500 more kelvins to 6,590 K takes around 0.3 billion years, but the next two steps of around 500 kelvins (to 6,030 K and 5,550 K) take first 0.4 and then 1.1 billion years.

Most observed white dwarfs have relatively high surface temperatures, between 8,000 K and 40,000 K. A white dwarf, though, spends more of its lifetime at cooler temperatures than at hotter temperatures, so we should expect that there are more cool white dwarfs than hot white dwarfs. Once we adjust for the selection effect that hotter, more luminous white dwarfs are easier to observe, we do find that decreasing the temperature range examined results in finding more white dwarfs. This trend stops when we reach extremely cool white dwarfs; few white dwarfs are observed with surface temperatures below 4,000 K, and one of the coolest so far observed, WD 0346+246, has a surface temperature of approximately 3,800 K. The reason for this is that the Universe's age is finite; there has not been enough time for white dwarfs to cool below this temperature. The white dwarf luminosity function can therefore be used to find the time when stars started to form in a region; an estimate for the age of our Galactic disk found in this way is 8 billion years. A white dwarf will eventually, in many trillions of years, cool and become a non-radiating black dwarf in approximate thermal equilibrium with its surroundings and with the cosmic background radiation. No black dwarfs are thought to exist yet.

White dwarf core material is a completely ionized plasma
– a mixture of nuclei and electrons – that is initially in a fluid state. It was theoretically predicted in the 1960s that at a late stage of cooling, it should crystallize into a solid state, starting at its center. The crystal structure is thought to be a body-centered cubic lattice. In 1995 it was suggested that asteroseismological observations of pulsating white dwarfs yielded a potential test of the crystallization theory, and in 2004, observations were made that suggested approximately 90% of the mass of BPM 37093 had crystallized. Other work gives a crystallized mass fraction of between 32% and 82%. As a white dwarf core undergoes crystallization into a solid phase, latent heat is released which provides a source of thermal energy that delays its cooling. Chemical fractionation between the ionic species in the plasma mixture can release a similar or even greater amount of energy. This energy release was first confirmed in 2019 after the identification of a pile up in the cooling sequence of more than 15,000 white dwarfs observed with the Gaia satellite.

Low-mass helium white dwarfs (mass ), often referred to as "extremely low-mass white dwarfs, ELM WDs" are formed in binary systems. As a result of their hydrogen-rich envelopes, residual hydrogen burning via the CNO cycle may keep these white dwarfs hot on a long timescale. In addition, they remain in a bloated proto-white dwarf stage for up to 2 Gyr before they reach the cooling track.

Atmosphere and spectra 

Although most white dwarfs are thought to be composed of carbon and oxygen, spectroscopy typically shows that their emitted light comes from an atmosphere which is observed to be either hydrogen or helium dominated. The dominant element is usually at least 1,000 times more abundant than all other elements. As explained by Schatzman in the 1940s, the high surface gravity is thought to cause this purity by gravitationally separating the atmosphere so that heavy elements are below and the lighter above. This atmosphere, the only part of the white dwarf visible to us, is thought to be the top of an envelope which is a residue of the star's envelope in the AGB phase and may also contain material accreted from the interstellar medium.

Although thin, these outer layers determine the thermal evolution of the white dwarf. The degenerate electrons in the bulk of a white dwarf conduct heat well. Most of a white dwarf's mass is therefore at almost the same temperature (isothermal), and it is also hot: a white dwarf with surface temperature between 8,000 K and 16,000 K will have a core temperature between approximately 5,000,000 K and 20,000,000 K. The white dwarf is kept from cooling very quickly only by its outer layers' opacity to radiation.

The first attempt to classify white dwarf spectra appears to have been by G. P. Kuiper in 1941, and various classification schemes have been proposed and used since then. The system currently in use was introduced by Edward M. Sion, Jesse L. Greenstein and their coauthors in 1983 and has been subsequently revised several times. It classifies a spectrum by a symbol which consists of an initial D, a letter describing the primary feature of the spectrum followed by an optional sequence of letters describing secondary features of the spectrum (as shown in the adjacent table), and a temperature index number, computed by dividing 50,400 K by the effective temperature. For example:
 A white dwarf with only He I lines in its spectrum and an effective temperature of 15,000 K could be given the classification of DB3, or, if warranted by the precision of the temperature measurement, DB3.5.
 A white dwarf with a polarized magnetic field, an effective temperature of 17,000 K, and a spectrum dominated by He I lines which also had hydrogen features could be given the classification of DBAP3.

The symbols "?" and ":" may also be used if the correct classification is uncertain.

White dwarfs whose primary spectral classification is DA have hydrogen-dominated atmospheres. They make up the majority, approximately 80%, of all observed white dwarfs. The next class in number is of DBs, approximately 16%. The hot, above 15,000 K, DQ class (roughly 0.1%) have carbon-dominated atmospheres. Those classified as DB, DC, DO, DZ, and cool DQ have helium-dominated atmospheres. Assuming that carbon and metals are not present, which spectral classification is seen depends on the effective temperature. Between approximately 100,000 K to 45,000 K, the spectrum will be classified DO, dominated by singly ionized helium. From 30,000 K to 12,000 K, the spectrum will be DB, showing neutral helium lines, and below about 12,000 K, the spectrum will be featureless and classified DC.

Molecular hydrogen (H2) has been detected in spectra of the atmospheres of some white dwarfs.

Metal-rich white dwarfs 
Around 25–33% of white dwarfs have metal lines in their spectra, which is notable because any heavy elements in a white dwarf should sink into the star's interior in just a small fraction of the star's lifetime. The prevailing explanation for metal-rich white dwarfs is that they have recently accreted rocky planetesimals. The bulk composition of the accreted object can be measured from the strengths of the metal lines. For example, a 2015 study of the white dwarf Ton 345 concluded that its metal abundances were consistent with those of a differentiated, rocky planet whose mantle had been eroded by the host star's wind during its asymptotic giant branch phase.

Magnetic field 
Magnetic fields in white dwarfs with a strength at the surface of c. 1 million gauss (100 teslas) were predicted by P. M. S. Blackett in 1947 as a consequence of a physical law he had proposed which stated that an uncharged, rotating body should generate a magnetic field proportional to its angular momentum. This putative law, sometimes called the Blackett effect, was never generally accepted, and by the 1950s even Blackett felt it had been refuted. In the 1960s, it was proposed that white dwarfs might have magnetic fields due to conservation of total surface magnetic flux that existed in its progenitor star phase. A surface magnetic field of c. 100 gauss (0.01 T) in the progenitor star would thus become a surface magnetic field of c. 100·1002 = 1 million gauss (100 T) once the star's radius had shrunk by a factor of 100. The first magnetic white dwarf to be discovered was GJ 742 (also known as ) which was identified by James Kemp, John Swedlund, John Landstreet and Roger Angel in 1970 to host a magnetic field by its emission of circularly polarized light. It is thought to have a surface field of approximately 300 million gauss (30 kT).

The large number of presently known magnetic white dwarfs is due to the fact that most white dwarfs are identified by low-resolution spectroscopy, which is able to reveal the presence of a magnetic field of 1 megagauss or more. Thus the basic identification process also sometimes results in discovery of magnetic fields. It has been estimated that at least 10% of white dwarfs have fields in excess of 1 million gauss (100 T).

The highly magnetized white dwarf in the binary system AR Scorpii was identified in 2016 as the first pulsar in which the compact object is a white dwarf instead of a neutron star.

Chemical bonds 
The magnetic fields in a white dwarf may allow for the existence of a new type of chemical bond, perpendicular paramagnetic bonding, in addition to ionic and covalent bonds, resulting in what has been initially described as "magnetized matter" in research published in 2012.

Variability 

Early calculations suggested that there might be white dwarfs whose luminosity varied with a period of around 10 seconds, but searches in the 1960s failed to observe this. The first variable white dwarf found was HL Tau 76; in 1965 and 1966, and was observed to vary with a period of approximately 12.5 minutes. The reason for this period being longer than predicted is that the variability of HL Tau 76, like that of the other pulsating variable white dwarfs known, arises from non-radial gravity wave pulsations. Known types of pulsating white dwarf include the DAV, or ZZ Ceti, stars, including HL Tau 76, with hydrogen-dominated atmospheres and the spectral type DA; DBV, or V777 Her, stars, with helium-dominated atmospheres and the spectral type DB; and GW Vir stars, sometimes subdivided into DOV and PNNV stars, with atmospheres dominated by helium, carbon, and oxygen. GW Vir stars are not, strictly speaking, white dwarfs, but are stars which are in a position on the Hertzsprung–Russell diagram between the asymptotic giant branch and the white dwarf region. They may be called pre-white dwarfs. These variables all exhibit small (1–30%) variations in light output, arising from a superposition of vibrational modes with periods of hundreds to thousands of seconds. Observation of these variations gives asteroseismological evidence about the interiors of white dwarfs.

Formation 
White dwarfs are thought to represent the end point of stellar evolution for main-sequence stars with masses from about 0.07 to 10 . The composition of the white dwarf produced will depend on the initial mass of the star. Current galactic models suggest the Milky Way galaxy currently contains about ten billion white dwarfs.

Stars with very low mass 
If the mass of a main-sequence star is lower than approximately half a solar mass, it will never become hot enough to fuse helium in its core. It is thought that, over a lifespan that considerably exceeds the age of the universe (c. 13.8 billion years), such a star will eventually burn all its hydrogen, for a while becoming a blue dwarf, and end its evolution as a helium white dwarf composed chiefly of helium-4 nuclei. Due to the very long time this process takes, it is not thought to be the origin of the observed helium white dwarfs. Rather, they are thought to be the product of mass loss in binary systems or mass loss due to a large planetary companion.

Stars with low to medium mass 
If the mass of a main-sequence star is between 0.5 and 8  like the Sun, its core will become sufficiently hot to fuse helium into carbon and oxygen via the triple-alpha process, but it will never become sufficiently hot to fuse carbon into neon. Near the end of the period in which it undergoes fusion reactions, such a star will have a carbon–oxygen core which does not undergo fusion reactions, surrounded by an inner helium-burning shell and an outer hydrogen-burning shell. On the Hertzsprung–Russell diagram, it will be found on the asymptotic giant branch. It will then expel most of its outer material, creating a planetary nebula, until only the carbon–oxygen core is left. This process is responsible for the carbon–oxygen white dwarfs which form the vast majority of observed white dwarfs.

Stars with medium to high mass 
If a star is massive enough, its core will eventually become sufficiently hot to fuse carbon to neon, and then to fuse neon to iron. Such a star will not become a white dwarf, because the mass of its central, non-fusing core, initially supported by electron degeneracy pressure, will eventually exceed the largest possible mass supportable by degeneracy pressure. At this point the core of the star will collapse and it will explode in a core-collapse supernova which will leave behind a remnant neutron star, black hole, or possibly a more exotic form of compact star. Some main-sequence stars, of perhaps 8 to 10 , although sufficiently massive to fuse carbon to neon and magnesium, may be insufficiently massive to fuse neon. Such a star may leave a remnant white dwarf composed chiefly of oxygen, neon, and magnesium, provided that its core does not collapse, and provided that fusion does not proceed so violently as to blow apart the star in a supernova. Although a few white dwarfs have been identified which may be of this type, most evidence for the existence of such comes from the novae called ONeMg or neon novae. The spectra of these novae exhibit abundances of neon, magnesium, and other intermediate-mass elements which appear to be only explicable by the accretion of material onto an oxygen–neon–magnesium white dwarf.

Type Iax supernova 
Type Iax supernovae, that involve helium accretion by a white dwarf, have been proposed to be a channel for transformation of this type of stellar remnant. In this scenario, the carbon detonation produced in a Type Ia supernova is too weak to destroy the white dwarf, expelling just a small part of its mass as ejecta, but produces an asymmetric explosion that kicks the star, often known as a zombie star, to high speeds of a hypervelocity star. The matter processed in the failed detonation is re-accreted by the white dwarf with the heaviest elements such as iron falling to its core where it accumulates. These iron-core white dwarfs would be smaller than the carbon–oxygen kind of similar mass and would cool and crystallize faster than those.

Fate 

A white dwarf is stable once formed and will continue to cool almost indefinitely, eventually to become a black dwarf. Assuming that the universe continues to expand, it is thought that in 1019 to 1020 years, the galaxies will evaporate as their stars escape into intergalactic space. White dwarfs should generally survive galactic dispersion, although an occasional collision between white dwarfs may produce a new fusing star or a super-Chandrasekhar mass white dwarf which will explode in a Type Ia supernova. The subsequent lifetime of white dwarfs is thought to be on the order of the hypothetical lifetime of the proton, known to be at least 1034–1035 years. Some grand unified theories predict a proton lifetime between 1030 and 1036 years. If these theories are not valid, the proton might still decay by complicated nuclear reactions or through quantum gravitational processes involving virtual black holes; in these cases, the lifetime is estimated to be no more than 10200 years. If protons do decay, the mass of a white dwarf will decrease very slowly with time as its nuclei decay, until it loses enough mass to become a nondegenerate lump of matter, and finally disappears completely.

A white dwarf can also be cannibalized or evaporated by a companion star, causing the white dwarf to lose so much mass that it becomes a planetary mass object. The resultant object, orbiting the former companion, now host star, could be a helium planet or diamond planet.

Debris disks and planets 

A white dwarf's stellar and planetary system is inherited from its progenitor star and may interact with the white dwarf in various ways. There are several indications that a white dwarf has a remnant planetary system.

The most common observable evidence of a remnant planetary system is pollution of the spectrum of a white dwarf with metal absorption lines. 27–50% of white dwarfs show a spectrum polluted with metals, but these heavy elements settle out in the atmosphere of white dwarfs colder than 20,000 K. The most widely accepted hypothesis is that this pollution comes from tidally disrupted rocky bodies. The first observation of a metal-polluted white dwarf was by van Maanen in 1917 at the Mount Wilson Observatory and is now recognized as the first evidence of exoplanets in astronomy. The white dwarf van Maanen 2 shows iron, calcium and magnesium in its atmosphere, but van Maanen misclassified it as the faintest F-type star based on the calcium H- and K-lines. The following heavy elements were discovered in the atmosphere of white dwarfs: Ca, Mg, Fe, Na, Si, Cr, C, O, Al?, Sc, Ti, V, Mn, Co, Ni, Cu, Sr, S, P, N, Li, K, Be. The nitrogen in white dwarfs is thought to come from nitrogen-ice of extrasolar Kuiper Belt objects, the lithium is thought to come from accreted crust material and the beryllium is thought to come from exomoons.

A less common observable evidence is infrared excess due to a flat and optically thick debris disk, which is found in around 1–4% of white dwarfs. The first white dwarf with infrared excess was discovered by Zuckerman&Becklin in 1987 in the near-infrared around Giclas 29-38 and later confirmed as a debris disk. White dwarfs hotter than 27,000 K sublimate all the dust formed by tidally disrupting a rocky body, preventing the formation of a debris disk. In colder white dwarfs, a rocky body might be tidally disrupted near the Roche radius and forced into a circular orbit by the Poynting–Robertson drag, which is stronger for less massive white dwarfs. The Poynting–Robertson drag will also cause the dust to orbit closer and closer towards the white dwarf, until it will eventually sublimate and the disk will disappear. A debris disk will have a lifetime of around a few million years for white dwarfs hotter than 10,000 K. Colder white dwarfs can have disk-lifetimes of a few 10 million years, which is enough time to tidally disrupt a second rocky body and forming a second disk around a white dwarf, such as the two rings around LSPM J0207+3331.

The least common observable evidence of planetary systems are detected major or minor planets. Only a handful giant planets and a handful of minor planets are known around white dwarfs. It is a growing list with discoveries of around 6 exoplanets expected with Gaia and 4 exoplanets with JWST.Infrared spectroscopic observations made by NASA's Spitzer Space Telescope of the central star of the Helix Nebula suggest the presence of a dust cloud, which may be caused by cometary collisions. It is possible that infalling material from this may cause X-ray emission from the central star. Similarly, observations made in 2004 indicated the presence of a dust cloud around the young (estimated to have formed from its AGB progenitor about 500 million years ago) white dwarf G29-38, which may have been created by tidal disruption of a comet passing close to the white dwarf. Some estimations based on the metal content of the atmospheres of the white dwarfs consider that at least 15% of them may be orbited by planets or asteroids, or at least their debris. Another suggested idea is that white dwarfs could be orbited by the stripped cores of rocky planets, that would have survived the red giant phase of their star but losing their outer layers and, given those planetary remnants would likely be made of metals, to attempt to detect them looking for the signatures of their interaction with the white dwarf's magnetic field. Other suggested ideas of how white dwarfs are polluted with dust involve the scattering of asteroids by planets or via planet-planet scattering. Liberation of exomoons from their host planet could cause white dwarf pollution with dust. Either the liberation could cause asteroids to be scattered towards the white dwarf or the exomoon could be scattered into the Roche radius of the white dwarf. The mechanism behind the pollution of white dwarfs in binaries was also explored as these systems are more likely to lack a major planet, but this idea cannot explain the presence of dust around single white dwarfs. While old white dwarfs show evidence of dust accretion, white dwarfs older than ~1 billion years or >7000 K with dusty infrared excess were not detected until the discovery of LSPM J0207+3331 in 2018, which has a cooling age of ~3 billion years. The white dwarf shows two dusty components that are being explained with two rings with different temperatures.

The metal-rich white dwarf WD 1145+017 is the first white dwarf observed with a disintegrating minor planet which transits the star. The disintegration of the planetesimal generates a debris cloud which passes in front of the star every 4.5 hours, causing a 5-minute-long fade in the star's optical brightness. The depth of the transit is highly variable.

The giant planet WD J0914+1914b is being evaporated by the strong ultraviolet radiation of the hot white dwarf. Part of the evaporated material is being accreted in a gaseous disk around the white dwarf. The weak hydrogen line as well as other lines in the spectrum of the white dwarf revealed the presence of the giant planet.

The white dwarf WD 0145+234 shows brightening in the mid-infrared, seen in NEOWISE data. The brightening is not seen before 2018. It is interpreted as the tidal disruption of an exoasteroid, the first time such an event has been observed.

WD 1856+534 is the first and only transiting major planet around a white dwarf (as of 2022).

Habitability 
It has been proposed that white dwarfs with surface temperatures of less than 10,000 Kelvins could harbor a habitable zone at a distance of c. 0.005 to 0.02 AU that would last upwards of 3 billion years. This is so close that any habitable planets would be tidally locked. The goal is to search for transits of hypothetical Earth-like planets that could have migrated inward or formed there. As a white dwarf has a size similar to that of a planet, these kinds of transits would produce strong eclipses. Newer research casts some doubts on this idea, given that the close orbits of those hypothetical planets around their parent stars would subject them to strong tidal forces that could render them uninhabitable by triggering a greenhouse effect. Another suggested constraint to this idea is the origin of those planets. Leaving aside formation from the accretion disk surrounding the white dwarf, there are two ways a planet could end in a close orbit around stars of this kind: by surviving being engulfed by the star during its red giant phase, and then spiralling inward, or inward migration after the white dwarf has formed. The former case is implausible for low-mass bodies, as they are unlikely to survive being absorbed by their stars. In the latter case, the planets would have to expel so much orbital energy as heat, through tidal interactions with the white dwarf, that they would likely end as uninhabitable embers.

Binary stars and novae 

If a white dwarf is in a binary star system and is accreting matter from its companion, a variety of phenomena may occur, including novae and Type Ia supernovae. It may also be a super-soft x-ray source if it is able to take material from its companion fast enough to sustain fusion on its surface. On the other hand, phenomena in binary systems such as tidal interaction and star–disc interaction, moderated by magnetic fields or not, act on the rotation of accreting white dwarfs. In fact, the (securely known) fastest-spinning white dwarfs are members of binary systems (the fastest one being the white dwarf in CTCV J2056-3014). A close binary system of two white dwarfs can radiate energy in the form of gravitational waves, causing their mutual orbit to steadily shrink until the stars merge.

Type Ia supernovae 

The mass of an isolated, nonrotating white dwarf cannot exceed the Chandrasekhar limit of ~1.4 . This limit may increase if the white dwarf is rotating rapidly and nonuniformly. White dwarfs in binary systems can accrete material from a companion star, increasing both their mass and their density. As their mass approaches the Chandrasekhar limit, this could theoretically lead to either the explosive ignition of fusion in the white dwarf or its collapse into a neutron star.

Accretion provides the currently favored mechanism called the single-degenerate model for Type Ia supernovae. In this model, a carbon–oxygen white dwarf accretes mass and compresses its core by pulling mass from a companion star. It is believed that compressional heating of the core leads to ignition of carbon fusion as the mass approaches the Chandrasekhar limit. Because the white dwarf is supported against gravity by quantum degeneracy pressure instead of by thermal pressure, adding heat to the star's interior increases its temperature but not its pressure, so the white dwarf does not expand and cool in response. Rather, the increased temperature accelerates the rate of the fusion reaction, in a runaway process that feeds on itself. The thermonuclear flame consumes much of the white dwarf in a few seconds, causing a Type Ia supernova explosion that obliterates the star. In another possible mechanism for Type Ia supernovae, the double-degenerate model, two carbon–oxygen white dwarfs in a binary system merge, creating an object with mass greater than the Chandrasekhar limit in which carbon fusion is then ignited.

Observations have failed to note signs of accretion leading up to Type Ia supernovae, and this is now thought to be because the star is first loaded up to above the Chandrasekhar limit while also being spun up to a very high rate by the same process. Once the accretion stops, the star gradually slows until the spin is no longer enough to prevent the explosion.

The historical bright SN 1006 is thought to have been a type Ia supernova from a white dwarf, possibly the merger of two white dwarfs. Tycho's Supernova of 1572 was also a type Ia supernova, and its remnant has been detected. A close candidate to being a survivor of a type Ia supernova is WD 0810-353.

Post-common envelope binary 

A post-common envelope binary (PCEB) is a binary consisting of a white dwarf and a closely tidally-locked red dwarf (in other cases this might be a brown dwarf instead of a red dwarf). These binaries form when the red dwarf is engulfed in the red giant phase. As the red dwarf orbits inside the common envelope, it is slowed down in the denser environment. This slowed orbital speed is compensated with a decrease of the orbital distance between the red dwarf and the core of the red giant. The red dwarf spirals inwards towards the core and might merge with the core. If this does not happen and instead the common envelope is ejected, then the binary ends up in a close orbit, consisting of a white dwarf and a red dwarf. This type of binary is called a post-common envelope binary. The evolution of the PCEB continues as the two dwarf stars orbit closer and closer due to magnetic braking and by releasing gravitational waves. The binary might evolve at some point into a cataclysmic variable, and therefore post-common envelope binaries are sometimes called pre-cataclysmic variables.

Cataclysmic variables 

Before accretion of material pushes a white dwarf close to the Chandrasekhar limit, accreted hydrogen-rich material on the surface may ignite in a less destructive type of thermonuclear explosion powered by hydrogen fusion. These surface explosions can be repeated as long as the white dwarf's core remains intact. This weaker kind of repetitive cataclysmic phenomenon is called a (classical) nova. Astronomers have also observed dwarf novae, which have smaller, more frequent luminosity peaks than the classical novae. These are thought to be caused by the release of gravitational potential energy when part of the accretion disc collapses onto the star, rather than through a release of energy due to fusion. In general, binary systems with a white dwarf accreting matter from a stellar companion are called cataclysmic variables. As well as novae and dwarf novae, several other classes of these variables are known, including polars and intermediate polars, both of which feature highly magnetic white dwarfs. Both fusion- and accretion-powered cataclysmic variables have been observed to be X-ray sources.

Other non-pre-supernova binaries 
Other non-pro-supernova binaries include binaries that consist of a main sequence star (or giant) and a white dwarf. The binary Sirius AB is probably the most famous example. White dwarfs can also exist as binaries or multiple star systems that only consist of white dwarfs. An example of a resolved triple white dwarf system is WD J1953-1019, discovered with Gaia DR2 data. One interesting field is the study of remnant planetary systems around white dwarfs. While stars are bright and often outshine the exoplanets and brown dwarfs that orbit them, the white dwarfs are faint. This allows astronomers to study these brown dwarfs or exoplanets in more detail. The sub-brown dwarf around the white dwarf WD 0806−661 is one such example.

Nearest

Gallery

See also

References

External links and further reading 

 General 

Rebassa-Mansergas, A.; Gänsicke, B. T.; Rodríguez-Gil, P.; Schreiber, M. R.; Koester, D. (28 November 2007). "Post-common-envelope binaries from SDSS – I. 101 white dwarf main-sequence binaries with multiple Sloan Digital Sky Survey spectroscopy: Post-common-envelope binaries from SDSS". Monthly Notices of the Royal Astronomical Society. 382 (4): 1377–1393. doi:10.1111/j.1365-2966.2007.12288.x.

 Physics 
 Black holes, white dwarfs, and neutron stars: the physics of compact objects, Stuart L. Shapiro and Saul A. Teukolsky, New York: Wiley, 1983. .
 
  — Discusses how to find mass-radius relations and mass limits for white dwarfs using simple energy arguments.

 Variability 
 

 Magnetic field 
 

 Frequency 
 

 Observational 
 
 
 
 

 Images 
 Astronomy Picture of the Day
 
 
 
 
 
 

Star types
Stellar evolution
Stellar phenomena
 
Exotic matter
Articles containing video clips